Carlton Tyrell Godwin (born July 10, 1979) is an American former professional baseball outfielder. He played in Major League Baseball (MLB) for the Washington Nationals.

College career
Godwin played both football and baseball at East Bladen High School, and collegiately while attending the University of North Carolina at Chapel Hill on the Morehead Scholarship.

Football
Godwin played primarily on special teams during the 1997 and 1998 seasons, leading the Atlantic Coast Conference with a 27.8 kickoff return average in 1998 and setting a school record with a 100-yard kickoff return for a touchdown against Stanford on September 19, 1998. Godwin did not play football for the Tar Heels after the 1998 season, deciding instead to concentrate on baseball.

Baseball
Godwin played 3 years of baseball for the Tar Heels, batting .337 in 1998, .371 in 1999 and .363 in 2000. Godwin was a third team All-American in 2000.

Professional career
Godwin was drafted by the New York Yankees (in 1997) and the Texas Rangers (in 2000) but did not sign with either team. He eventually signed with the Toronto Blue Jays after being drafted in the 3rd round (91st overall) of the 2001 amateur draft. He played in the Blue Jays' minor league system for four years before the Washington Nationals selected him in the rule 5 draft.

Godwin played in three games for the Nationals during the 2005 season, wearing #1. He continued to play in the minor leagues until 2007.

References

External links

1979 births
Living people
African-American baseball players
Sportspeople from Wilmington, North Carolina
Baseball players from North Carolina
Major League Baseball outfielders
Washington Nationals players
North Carolina Tar Heels football players
North Carolina Tar Heels baseball players
Auburn Doubledays players
Charleston AlleyCats players
Dunedin Blue Jays players
New Haven Ravens players
New Hampshire Fisher Cats players
New Orleans Zephyrs players
Chattanooga Lookouts players
Louisville Bats players
Columbus Clippers players
Peoria Javelinas players
21st-century African-American sportspeople
20th-century African-American sportspeople